Marianne Dubuc may refer to:

 Marianne Dubuc (figure skater) (born 1983), Canadian figure skater
 Marianne Dubuc (illustrator) (born 1980), Canadian writer and illustrator